Rawhide Rangers is a 1941 American Western film directed by Ray Taylor and written by Ed Earl Repp. The film stars Johnny Mack Brown, Fuzzy Knight, Kathryn Adams Doty, Nell O'Day, Riley Hill and Harry Cording. The film was released on July 18, 1941, by Universal Pictures. In 1949, a loose remake was released called The Pecos Pistol directed by Will Cowan.

Plot
Someone dear to Brand Calhoun was killed, so he decides to get himself kicked from the force and disguise himself as an outlaw. Now he has to infiltrate the gang of outlaws and come up with a plan to find the killer and bring the gang down.

Cast        
Johnny Mack Brown as Brand Calhoun
Fuzzy Knight as Porky Blake
Kathryn Adams Doty as Jo Ann Rawlings
Nell O'Day as Patti McDowell
Riley Hill as Steve Calhoun
Harry Cording as Blackie
Alan Bridge as Rawlings
Frank Shannon as Captain McDowell
Ed Cassidy as Alec Martin
Bob Kortman as Dirk
Chester Gan as Sing Lo 
James Farley as Banker

References

External links
 

1941 films
American Western (genre) films
1941 Western (genre) films
Universal Pictures films
Films directed by Ray Taylor
American black-and-white films
1940s English-language films
1940s American films